Flower Hill is a ghost town in Bastrop County, Texas, United States. It is located within the Greater Austin metropolitan area.

History
Founded by emancipated slaves, the town is one of 13 known "Freedom Colonies," in the county. In the 1940s, a church, a cemetery and several houses marked the town on county highway maps. By the 1980s, only the cemetery remained.

Geography
It is located three miles southeast of Smithville, 19 miles southeast of the town of Bastrop and 49 miles southeast of Austin.

Education
In 1907, Flower Hill had a one-teacher school for fifty-four black students. When a district system was created in 1921, the school was probably absorbed by the Smithville Independent School District. The community continues to be served by Smithville ISD today.

References

Ghost towns in Texas
Ghost towns in Central Texas